Fatikh Saubanovich Sibagatullin (1 May 1950 – 24 June 2022) was a Russian politician. A member of United Russia, he served in the State Duma from 2007 to 2021.

Sibagatullin died in Moscow on 24 June 2022 at the age of 72.

References

1950 births
2022 deaths
People from Arsky District
Russian veterinarians
Recipients of the Order "For Merit to the Fatherland", 4th class
Recipients of the Order of Honour (Russia)
Recipients of the Order of Friendship of Peoples
Knights of the Order of Agricultural Merit
United Russia politicians
Mayors of places in Russia
Fifth convocation members of the State Duma (Russian Federation)
Sixth convocation members of the State Duma (Russian Federation)
Seventh convocation members of the State Duma (Russian Federation)